A brumby is an Australian term for a feral horse.

Brumby may also refer to:

 Brumby (surname)
 Brumbies, a Canberra-based rugby union team competing in Super Rugby
 Brumby Engineering College
 Brumby's Bakeries, chain of retail bakeries
 USS Brumby (FF-1044)
 Subaru Brumby, the Australian-market name of the Subaru BRAT
Brumby, Lincolnshire, former village

See also
 Brumby shooting, feral horse eradication in Australia
 Silver Brumby (disambiguation)